Events from the year 1331 in Ireland.

Incumbent
Lord: Edward III

Events

 "A hosting by the Connachtmen, both Foreigner and Gaidhel, into Munster, against Mac Conmara. Pledge and sway were gained by them on Mac Conmara. A church was burned by a party of the host, wherein were two score and one hundred persons, both noble and base and two priests were of them and those all were burned."
 "Ten of the people of Donnchadh the Swarthy, son of Mael-Shechlainn Carrach Mac Diarmata, were drowned on Loch-Teiched."
 January 21 Parliament at Dublin
 February 27 Anthony de Luci appointed justicier
 March 3 William de Burgh, Earl of Ulster, appointed lieutenant. Ordinances for Conduct of Irish government includes a decree that there should be one law for Irish and Anglo-Irish, except for betaghs
 April 21 Irish raid and capture Arklow
 April 25 Irish raid Tallaght
 Irish raids in County Wexford.
 July 1 Irish Parliament meets at Dublin
 August Irish raid and capture Ferns
 August 16 Earl of Desmond captured by Justiciar at Limerick
 Edward III plans expedition to Ireland for 1332
 September Henry de Mandeville arrested
 Walter de Burgh defeats Tommaltach Mac Diarmata in Moylurg
 November Walter de Burgh arrested and imprisoned by the Earl of Ulster

Births
4 October – James Butler, 2nd Earl of Ormonde, Lord Justice of Ireland (died 1382).

Deaths

 Tadhg mac Cathal mac Domnall Ua Conchobair rested in Christ

References

"The Annals of Ireland by Friar John Clyn", edited and translated with an Introduction, by Bernadette Williams, Four Courts Press, 2007. , pp. 240–244.
"A New History of Ireland VIII: A Chronology of Irish History to 1976", edited by T. W. Moody, F.X. Martin and F.J. Byrne. Oxford, 1982. .
http://www.ucc.ie/celt/published/T100001B/index.html
http://www.ucc.ie/celt/published/T100005C/index.html
http://www.ucc.ie/celt/published/T100010B/index.html

 
1330s in Ireland
Ireland
Years of the 14th century in Ireland